This article is a list of fictional characters in the DC Comics comic book series Hitman.

Protagonists

Tommy Monaghan 
Tommy Monaghan is a hitman from "The Cauldron", the Irish section of Gotham City. He received telepathy and X-ray vision after being bitten by an alien from Bloodlines, something which he generally tries to keep secret. With or without the powers, he is as good as any hitman in Gotham.

He was raised in Saint Killian's orphanage by Sister Concepta, spending much of his childhood with Pat Noonan and Pat's uncle, Sean. He first saw a gun when a bully pulled one on him after a fight; he survived after he stared the bully down. Tommy intended to go to Gotham University with Pat in 1989 and the two tried to buy pot off a local thug to resell it at university - when the dealer tried to threaten Pat for more money, Tommy shot him.

In order for Sean to convince the dealer's cousins not to retaliate, Tommy had to leave Gotham and he joined the United States Marine Corps. There he met and befriended Natt (and killed his second victims, two Marines trying to assault Natt). They went to the Gulf War together, and inadvertently killed some British SAS soldiers one night in a "friendly fire" incident they never reported. After the war, he returned to Gotham and became a professional hitman.

He always wears sunglasses to hide his all-black eyes - another side effect of Bloodlines. He is unable to cry with these eyes.

Natt the Hat 
Natt "the Hat" Walls is Tommy's partner. Growing up in Detroit, he joined the Marines to get away from the gangs. There he met and befriended Tommy. They went to the Gulf War together, and inadvertently killed some British SAS soldiers one night in a "friendly fire" incident they never reported. After the war, he tried to return to his gang, but a policeman saved his life and the gang suspected treachery. Natt fled, settling into Gotham with Tommy. Natt promised his dying mother that he would no longer curse, as "the air used to turn blue around" him. He starts swearing again around issue #23, due to the current situation. The series uses the term "mothaloving" in place of more realistic swearing.

Sean Noonan 
Sean Noonan is Tommy's father figure. Sean raised his nephew Pat, Tommy's best friend since youth. Sean was at one time a hitman of some reputation in the city. Years later, he joined the Marines and fought in Korea, where he saw every man in his platoon die.

He came to Gotham, got a job tending bar, and eventually won the bar in a poker game.  "Noonan's Sleazy Bar" became the resident hang out for local hitmen: "Sleazy Bar" was originally graffiti put up by Pat and Tommy in 1979, which Sean intended to paint over for ten years before giving up. Around that time, he saved a young police officer named Connolly from two robbers. In such ways, he collected many favors over the years.

He wanted "The Old Dog" put on his tombstone; after his death in 2000, Tommy instead put "Beloved Father".

Ringo Chen 
Ringo Chen is the other best hitman in town and even more cold-blooded than Tommy (though nobody is sure who is deadlier). There is always tension between the two, as everybody expects they will square off one day. Despite this, he and Tommy get to be close. Ringo grew up in an extremely poor village in China, but never went hungry because his parents would often go without food instead; in order to tend to them once he grew up, he joined the People's Liberation Army. When he refused to shoot protestors in Tiananmen Square, he was imprisoned, tortured - and his parents were murdered. He escaped, killed his commanders and fled to New York, where he became a hitman, initially for his cousin, later freelance. Ringo believes that he met Death once, after a hit.

Ringo was inspired by Chow Yun Fat's gun wielding characters in movies directed by John Woo.

Deborah Tiegel 
Deborah Tiegel is Tommy's love interest for most of the series. An officer in the Gotham Police Department, she eventually is thrown off the force for not participating in widespread corruption. She lives with her senile grandfather and her mother - with her grandfather implied to be an ex-Nazi, which everyone ignores. She is always referred to as the only truly good person in Tommy's life, and often breaks up with him because he kills people for a living. She is an exceptional marksman, and often provides sniper cover for the heroes amid large firefights.

Hacken 
Hacken hangs out at Noonan's as much as anybody (including Sean) and joins in with the killer talk, but does not seem to be a professional; they mostly just make fun of him. At one point, he refers to himself and Ringo as partners, "just like Tommy and Natt", and Ringo doesn't have the heart to dissuade him. Early on in the series, having become involved in a zombie battle at the Gotham Aquarium, Hacken cuts off his own zombie bitten hand - only to shortly thereafter discover the bite would not in fact have killed him.

Hacken wanted to help Tommy and Natt in their final battle but was knocked unconscious by Tommy, so that he'd survive. JLA/Hitman and #50 show that he continues to stay at Noonan's until his old age, and fifty years after Tommy's death he tells some Gotham Uni students the truth about his friends.

Hacken is later seen trying to assist Superman with alien difficulty in Metropolis. He had also made friends with long-time Superman fan Bibbo Bibbowski Hacken is later seen trying to improve his mind by joining a book club. He also keeps an eye out for Six Pac, who has returned to chaos of Noonan's Bar. This is being run by Baytor, a demon from Hell.

Supporting characters 
 Pat Noonan is Sean's nephew, and Tommy's best friend since childhood. The first time Tommy killed somebody was to save Pat's life. When the series begins, he is Tommy's weapon supplier. He makes fun of Hacken more than anybody else does, and the bar patrons (especially Hacken) regard him as a loudmouth. When Natt arrives, Pat grows more insecure about his friendship with Tommy. To everyone's surprise, he dies rather than talk when Johnny Navarone tortures him for information - a grief-stricken Tommy tells him he wishes Pat had talked. 
 Sixpack is a short drunk who thinks he is a superhero. He often has drunken delusions of team-ups with Batman and other heroes. He occasionally leads his superhero team, Section 8. He ends up becoming a real hero, sacrificing himself to save the city from demons. The regulars at Noonan's build a statue to him in a local park.
 Sister Concepta is a nun who works at Saint Killian's. She took a special interest in Tommy growing up, partly because she had a romantic relationship with Sean Noonan.
 Wendy is the first woman Tommy dates in the series. She believes descriptions of his life are humorous jokes, and she dumps him as soon as she finds out they are not. She returns to the series sporadically.
 Baytor is the Lord of Insanity in Hell, until Etrigan steals his crown. He escapes Hell, and becomes the bartender at Noonan's. With rare exceptions, he says only "I am Baytor!" - he says his only normal words in #60 ("goodbye boys"), after Tommy and Natt go to their deaths and when nobody can hear him. He has the ability to project a liquid onto enemies, which dries. The enemies then shatter. He continues to tend Noonan's for at least fifty years. 
 Maggie Lorenzo is a poor local woman who first meets Tommy when her son goes missing. Eventually, she turns to Tommy whenever she has a problem. In the final story, she is marked for death by the CIA after seeing something she shouldn't have.
 Kathryn McAllister is Tommy's last love interest in the series. A CIA agent modeled after Dana Scully from The X-Files, she first shows up in a one-page gag in "Local Heroes" (in which she manipulates Green Lantern, as ordered by Agent Truman). In Closing Time, the final arc of the series, McAllister has left Truman's employ and enlists Tommy and Natt to take Truman down. 
 In Ennis' Marvel Max run on the Punisher, he has a CIA agent named Kathryn O'Brien with the same personality and appearance as McAllister: #5 says she was in jail before the CIA rehired her, #21 says she used to have the surname "McAllister", and in #40 she refers to "that stupid bastard Tommy" as the sort of "truly, irrevocably doomed" man she falls for. It is likely they are intended to be the same character.   
 Etrigan the Demon initially met Tommy immediately following the Bloodlines parasite attack that grants Tommy's powers, participating in the incident in which Joe Dubelz was killed. It later hired Tommy to kill a rival demon, then refused to pay him. After this betrayal, Tommy teamed up with Jason Blood to steal The Demon's heart. The final time it met Tommy (and the only time within the actual Hitman comic book; the other three incidents took place in the comic book The Demon, also written by Ennis and drawn by McCrea), it provided Tommy with a gun that can kill the demon Mawzir in exchange for Tommy recovering Etrigan's stolen heart.

Villains 
 Moe Dubelz is one half of a pair of conjoined twins who share a body. His brother Joe is killed by Tommy, and he swears revenge. The brothers control one of Gotham's major mobs.
 The Mawzir is a demon from Hell who attempts to enlist Tommy's services for its masters, the Lords of the Gun (also called the Arkannone). The Mawzir is formed from the souls of five dead Nazis who were executed by the Russians towards the end of the Second World War.
 Night Fist is a Gotham City vigilante who uses oversized fists as weapons. He also steals criminal's drugs for his own use and profit. 
 Johnny Navarone is the best assassin in the world; he travels the world killing only the best local killers.  Moe Dubelz hires him to kill Tommy. Later, his son, who is an even better marksman, is hired by Truman to kill Tommy.
 Agent Truman is a CIA agent who is jealous of superhumans. He attempts to hire Tommy as an agent to rein in and possibly kill heroes, and later funds experiments trying to recreate the effects of Bloodlines.
 Doctor Jackson from the Injun Peak Facility always hires Tommy and Natt to clean up his messes when various experiments his scientists are performing escape go wrong.
 "Men's Room Louie" Feretti is one of the main mob bosses in Gotham. He is so named because, due to a medical condition, he requires constant toilet use, from where he conducts all business. Eventually, Tommy is falsely blamed for his death, and various other Ferettis try to take revenge.

References 

Characters created by Garth Ennis
Hitman